John Raymond Pillion (August 10, 1904 – December 31, 1978) was an American lawyer and politician from New York.

Life
He was born on August 10, 1904, in Conneaut, Ohio. He graduated from Cornell Law School in 1927. He practiced law in Erie County, New York. He was president and treasurer of the Bison Storage & Warehouse Corporation in Buffalo, and the owner and operator of a fruit and vegetable farm in Niagara County.

He was a city court judge in Lackawanna, New York from 1932 to 1936; Corporation Counsel and Tax Attorney of the City of Lackawanna from 1936 to 1941.

He was a member of the New York State Assembly (Erie Co., 8th D.) from 1941 to 1950, sitting in the 163rd, 164th, 165th, 166th and 167th New York State Legislatures.

He was elected as a Republican to the 83rd, 84th, 85th, 86th, 87th and 88th United States Congresses, holding office from January 3, 1953, to January 3, 1965. In Congress, he was most notable as an opponent of statehood for both Hawaii and Alaska. He was defeated for re-election in 1964 by Richard D. McCarthy. Pillion voted in favor of the Civil Rights Acts of 1957, 1960, and 1964, as well as the 24th Amendment to the U.S. Constitution.

He retired to Hamburg, and died in Eden, New York on December 31, 1978.

References

 

1904 births
1978 deaths
Cornell Law School alumni
Republican Party members of the New York State Assembly
People from Conneaut, Ohio
American politicians of Polish descent
Republican Party members of the United States House of Representatives from New York (state)
People from Hamburg, New York
People from Lackawanna, New York
20th-century American politicians